Richard Charles Rodgers (June 28, 1902 – December 30, 1979) was an American composer who worked primarily in musical theater. With 43 Broadway musicals and over 900 songs to his credit, Rodgers was one of the most well-known American composers of the 20th century, and his compositions had a significant influence on popular music.

Rodgers is known for his songwriting partnerships, first with lyricist Lorenz Hart and then with Oscar Hammerstein II. With Hart he wrote musicals throughout the 1920s and 1930s, including Pal Joey, A Connecticut Yankee, On Your Toes and Babes in Arms. With Hammerstein he wrote musicals through the 1940s and 1950s, such as Oklahoma!, Flower Drum Song, Carousel, South Pacific, The King and I, and The Sound of Music. His collaborations with Hammerstein, in particular, are celebrated for bringing the Broadway musical to a new maturity by telling stories that were focused on characters and drama rather than the earlier light-hearted entertainment of the genre.

Rodgers was the first person to win all four of the top American entertainment awards in theater, film, recording, and televisiona Tony, an Oscar, a Grammy, and an Emmynow known collectively as an EGOT. In addition, he was awarded a Pulitzer Prize, making him one of only two people to receive all five awards (Marvin Hamlisch is the other). In 1978, Rodgers was in the inaugural group of Kennedy Center Honorees for lifetime achievement in the arts.

Biography

Early life and education

Born into a Jewish family in Queens, New York, Rodgers was the son of Mamie (Levy) and Dr William Abrahams Rodgers, a prominent physician who had changed the family name from Rogazinsky. Rodgers began playing the piano at the age of six. He attended P.S. 166, Townsend Harris Hall and DeWitt Clinton High School. Rodgers spent his early teenage summers in Camp Wigwam (Waterford, Maine) where he composed some of his first songs.

Rodgers, Lorenz Hart, and later collaborator Oscar Hammerstein II all attended Columbia University. At Columbia, Rodgers joined the Pi Lambda Phi fraternity. In 1921, Rodgers shifted his studies to the Institute of Musical Art (now the Juilliard School). Rodgers was influenced by composers such as Victor Herbert and Jerome Kern, as well as by the operettas his parents took him to see on Broadway when he was a child.

Career

Rodgers and Hart

In 1919, Richard met Lorenz Hart, thanks to Phillip Levitt, a friend of Richard's older brother. Rodgers and Hart struggled for years in the field of musical comedy, writing several amateur shows. They made their professional debut with the song "Any Old Place With You", featured in the 1919 Broadway musical comedy A Lonely Romeo. Their first professional production was the 1920 Poor Little Ritz Girl, which also had music by Sigmund Romberg. Their next professional show, The Melody Man, did not premiere until 1924.

When he was just out of college Rodgers worked as musical director for Lew Fields. Among the stars he accompanied were Nora Bayes and Fred Allen. Rodgers was considering quitting show business altogether to sell children's underwear, when he and Hart finally broke through in 1925. They wrote the songs for a benefit show presented by the prestigious Theatre Guild, called The Garrick Gaieties, and the critics found the show fresh and delightful. Although it was meant to run only one day, the Guild knew they had a success and allowed it to re-open later. The show's biggest hit—the song that Rodgers believed "made" Rodgers and Hart—was "Manhattan". The two were now a Broadway songwriting force.

Throughout the rest of the decade, the duo wrote several hit shows for both Broadway and London, including Dearest Enemy (1925), The Girl Friend (1926), Peggy-Ann (1926), A Connecticut Yankee (1927), and Present Arms (1928).  Their 1920s shows produced standards such as "Here in My Arms", "Mountain Greenery", "Blue Room", "My Heart Stood Still" and "You Took Advantage of Me".

With the Depression in full swing during the first half of the 1930s, the team sought greener pastures in Hollywood. The hardworking Rodgers later regretted these relatively fallow years, but he and Hart did write some classic songs and film scores while out west, including Love Me Tonight (1932) (directed by Rouben Mamoulian, who would later direct Rodgers's Oklahoma! on Broadway), which introduced three standards: "Lover", "Mimi", and "Isn't It Romantic?". Rodgers also wrote a melody for which Hart wrote three consecutive lyrics which were either cut, not recorded or not a hit. The fourth lyric resulted in one of their most famous songs, "Blue Moon". Other film work includes the scores to The Phantom President (1932), starring George M. Cohan, Hallelujah, I’m a Bum (1933), starring Al Jolson, and, in a quick return after having left Hollywood, Mississippi (1935), starring Bing Crosby and W. C. Fields.

In 1935, they returned to Broadway and wrote an almost unbroken string of hit shows that ended shortly before Hart's death in 1943. Among the most notable are Jumbo (1935), On Your Toes (1936, which included the ballet "Slaughter on Tenth Avenue", choreographed by George Balanchine), Babes in Arms (1937), I Married an Angel (1938), The Boys from Syracuse (1938), Pal Joey (1940), and their last original work, By Jupiter (1942). Rodgers also contributed to the book on several of these shows.

Many of the songs from these shows are still sung and remembered, including "The Most Beautiful Girl in the World", "My Romance", "Little Girl Blue", "I'll Tell the Man in the Street", "There's a Small Hotel", "Where or When", "My Funny Valentine", "The Lady Is a Tramp", "Falling in Love with Love", "Bewitched, Bothered and Bewildered", and "Wait till You See Her".

In 1939, Rodgers wrote the ballet Ghost Town for the Ballet Russe de Monte Carlo, with choreography by Marc Platoff.

Rodgers and Hammerstein

Rodgers' partnership with Hart began having problems because of the lyricist's unreliability and declining health. Rodgers began working with Oscar Hammerstein II, with whom he had previously written songs (before ever working with Lorenz Hart). Their first musical, the groundbreaking hit Oklahoma! (1943), is a notable example of a "book musical", a musical play in which the songs and dances are fully integrated into the plot. What was once a collection of songs, dances and comic turns held together by a tenuous plot became a fully integrated narrative. Even though Show Boat is considered to be the earliest example of a book musical, Oklahoma! epitomized the innovations for which Show Boat had laid the groundwork and is considered the first production in American history to be intentionally marketed as a fully integrated musical.

The team went on to create four more hits that are among the most popular in musical history. Each was made into a successful film: Carousel (1945), South Pacific (1949, winner of the 1950 Pulitzer Prize for Drama), The King and I (1951), and The Sound of Music (1959). Other shows include the minor hit Flower Drum Song (1958), as well as relative failures Allegro (1947), Me and Juliet (1953), and Pipe Dream (1955). They also wrote the score to the film State Fair (1945) (which was remade in 1962 with Pat Boone) and a special TV musical of Cinderella (1957).

Their collaboration produced many well-known songs, including "Oh, What a Beautiful Mornin'", "People Will Say We're in Love", "Oklahoma" (which also became the state song of Oklahoma), "It's A Grand Night For Singing", "If I Loved You", "You'll Never Walk Alone", "It Might as Well Be Spring", "Some Enchanted Evening", "Younger Than Springtime", "Bali Hai", "Getting to Know You", "My Favorite Things", "The Sound of Music", "Sixteen Going on Seventeen", "Climb Ev'ry Mountain", "Do-Re-Mi", and "Edelweiss", Hammerstein's last song.

Much of Rodgers' work with both Hart and Hammerstein was orchestrated by Robert Russell Bennett. Rodgers composed twelve themes, which Bennett used in preparing the orchestra score for the 26-episode World War II television documentary Victory at Sea (1952–53). This NBC production pioneered the "compilation documentary"—programming based on pre-existing footage—and was eventually broadcast in dozens of countries. The melody of the popular song "No Other Love" was later taken from the Victory at Sea theme entitled "Beneath the Southern Cross".  Rodgers won an Emmy for the music for the ABC documentary Winston Churchill: The Valiant Years, scored by Eddie Sauter, Hershy Kay, and Robert Emmett Dolan. Rodgers composed the theme music, "March of the Clowns", for the 1963–64 television series The Greatest Show on Earth, which ran for 30 episodes. He also contributed the main title theme for the 1963–64 historical anthology television series The Great Adventure.

In 1950, Rodgers and Hammerstein received The Hundred Year Association of New York's Gold Medal Award "in recognition of outstanding contributions to the City of New York." Rodgers, Hammerstein, and Joshua Logan won the Pulitzer Prize for Drama for South Pacific. Rodgers and Hammerstein had won a special Pulitzer Prize in 1944 for Oklahoma!.

In 1954, Rodgers conducted the New York Philharmonic Orchestra in excerpts from Victory at Sea, Slaughter on Tenth Avenue and the Carousel Waltz for a special LP released by Columbia Records.

Rodgers and Hammerstein musicals earned a total of 37 Tony Awards, 15 Academy Awards, two Pulitzer Prizes, two Grammy Awards, and two Emmy Awards.

After Hammerstein
After Hammerstein's death in 1960, Rodgers wrote both words and music for his first new Broadway project No Strings (1962, which earned two Tony Awards). The show was a minor hit and featured the song, "The Sweetest Sounds".

Rodgers also wrote both the words and music for two new songs used in the film version of The Sound of Music. (Other songs in that film were from Rodgers and Hammerstein.)

Rodgers went on to work with lyricists: Stephen Sondheim (Do I Hear a Waltz?) who was a protégé of Hammerstein, Martin Charnin (Two by Two, I Remember Mama) and Sheldon Harnick (Rex).

At its 1978 commencement ceremonies, Barnard College awarded Rodgers its highest honor, the Barnard Medal of Distinction.

Rodgers was an honoree at the first Kennedy Center Honors in 1978.

At the 1979 Tony Awards ceremony—six months before his death—Rodgers was presented the Lawrence Langner Memorial Award for Distinguished Lifetime Achievement in the American Theatre.

Death and legacy
Rodgers died in 1979, aged 77, after surviving cancer of the jaw, a heart attack, and a laryngectomy. He was cremated, and his ashes were scattered at sea.

In 1990, the 46th Street Theatre was renamed the Richard Rodgers Theatre in his memory. In 1999, Rodgers and Hart were each commemorated on United States postage stamps. In 2002, the centennial year of Rodgers' birth was celebrated worldwide with books, retrospectives, performances, new recordings of his music, and a Broadway revival of Oklahoma!. The BBC Proms that year devoted an entire evening to Rodgers' music, including a concert performance of Oklahoma! The Boston Pops Orchestra released a new CD that year in tribute to Rodgers, entitled My Favorite Things: A Richard Rodgers Celebration.

Alec Wilder wrote the following about Rodgers:

Rodgers is a member of the American Theater Hall of Fame.

Along with the Academy of Arts and Letters, Rodgers also started and endowed an award for non-established musical theater composers to produce new productions either by way of full productions or staged readings. It is the only award for which the Academy of Arts and Letters accepts applications and is presented every year. Below are the previous winners of the award:

Relationship with performers

Rosemary Clooney recorded a version of "Falling in Love with Love" by Rodgers, using a swing style. After the recording session Richard Rodgers told her pointedly that it should be sung as a waltz. The 1961 doo-wop arrangement of the Rodgers and Hart song "Blue Moon" by The Marcels so incensed Rodgers that he took out full-page newspaper ads urging people not to buy it. His efforts were unsuccessful as it reached #1 on the charts. After Doris Day recorded "I Have Dreamed" in 1961, he wrote to her and her arranger, Jim Harbert, that theirs was the most beautiful rendition of his song he had ever heard.

After Peggy Lee recorded her version of "Lover", a Rodgers song, with a dramatically different arrangement from that originally conceived by him, Rodgers said, "I don't know why Peggy picked on me, she could have fucked up Silent Night".  Mary Martin said that Richard Rodgers composed songs for her for South Pacific, knowing she had a small vocal range, and the songs generally made her look her best. She also said that Rodgers and Hammerstein listened to all her suggestions and she worked extremely well with them. Both Rodgers and Hammerstein wanted Doris Day for the lead in the film version of South Pacific and she reportedly wanted the part.  They discussed it with her, but after her manager/husband Martin Melcher would not budge on his demand for a high salary for her, the role went to Mitzi Gaynor.

Advocacy for writers' rights

In 1943, Richard Rodgers became the ninth president of the Dramatists Guild of America .

Personal life
In 1930, Rodgers married Dorothy Belle Feiner (1909–92). Their daughter, Mary (1931–2014), was the composer of Once Upon a Mattress and an author of children's books. The Rodgers' later lost a daughter at birth. Another daughter, Linda (1935–2015), also had a brief career as a songwriter.  Mary's son and Richard Rodgers's grandson, Adam Guettel (b. 1964), also a musical theater composer, won Tony Awards for Best Score and Best Orchestrations for The Light in the Piazza in 2005. Peter Melnick (b. 1958), Linda Rodgers's son, is the composer of Adrift In Macao, which debuted at the Philadelphia Theatre Company in 2005 and was produced Off-Broadway in 2007. Mary Rodgers' book Shy: The Alarmingly Outspoken Memoirs of Mary Rodgers was published posthumously in 2022, and included her frank revelations and assessments of her father, family and herself.

Rodgers was an atheist. He was prone to depression and alcohol abuse and was at one time hospitalized.

Awards and nominations 
Rodgers is one of the few entertainers to have won the EGOT, the Emmy, Grammy, Oscar, and Tony.

Shows with music by Rodgers

Lyrics by Lorenz Hart

Lyrics by Oscar Hammerstein II

Other lyricists and solo works

References

Further reading

External links

 
City Journal article on Rodgers
Centennial features on Rodgers
The Richard Rodgers Collection at the Library of Congress
Richard Rodgers papers, 1914–1989, held by the Billy Rose Theatre Division, New York Public Library for the Performing Arts
Musicals by Rodgers and Hammerstein
TimeLine of Rodgers' Life
Review and analysis of Rodgers' later plays

A feature on Rodgers and Hammerstein.
 
 Richard Rodgers recordings at the Discography of American Historical Recordings.

1902 births
1979 deaths
20th-century American dramatists and playwrights
20th-century American composers
Jewish American atheists
American musical theatre composers
American people of German-Jewish descent
Ballet composers
Best Original Song Academy Award-winning songwriters
Broadway composers and lyricists
Columbia College (New York) alumni
DeWitt Clinton High School alumni
Emmy Award winners
Grammy Award winners
Jewish American composers
Jewish American songwriters
Kennedy Center honorees
Male musical theatre composers
People from Queens, New York
Pulitzer Prize for Drama winners
Pulitzer Prize winners
Pupils of Percy Goetschius
Songwriters from New York (state)
Special Tony Award recipients
Tony Award winners
Townsend Harris High School alumni